José Llauro (22 October 1888 – 28 July 1976) was an Argentine fencer. He competed in the individual épée event at the 1928 Summer Olympics.

References

External links
 

1888 births
1976 deaths
Argentine male fencers
Argentine épée fencers
Olympic fencers of Argentina
Fencers at the 1928 Summer Olympics